TUI Airways Limited (formerly Thomsonfly and Thomson Airways) is a British charter airline, offering scheduled and charter flights from the United Kingdom and Ireland to destinations in Europe, Africa, Asia and North America.

The airline is the world's largest charter airline, carrying 11.8 million passengers in 2019. It is also the fourth-largest UK airline by total passengers carried, after EasyJet, British Airways and Jet2.com. TUI Airways is also the world's tenth-largest airline by number of route pairings served. Its UK and associated regional arm is TUI Airways Ltd which holds a United Kingdom Civil Aviation Authority (CAA) Type A Operating Licence permitting it to carry passengers, cargo and mail on aircraft with 20 or more seats. Its head office and Registered Office is Wigmore House in Luton, Bedfordshire.

History

TUI Airways has its origins in several rival airlines. Euravia (later renamed Britannia Airways in December 1964.), an airline which was founded in January 1962. Orion Airways, founded in 1979 by Horizon Holidays and later owned by the large brewing firm Bass Brewery and InterContinental Hotels Group, was sold and merged with Britannia Airways in 1989 but retained the Britannia name. (These events happened before TUI came to the UK.) Britannia was rebranded to Thomsonfly in May 2005 as their parent company Thomson Travel Group were bought by TUI Group as part of a wider reorganisation of TUI's operations in the UK. The other airline, Air 2000 that was founded in 1987, and which integrated the operations of Leisure International Airways in 1998. They became First Choice Airways in 2004 after being bought by First Choice and became their in-house airline.

Thomsonfly and First Choice Airways merged following the merger of the travel divisions of TUI Group and First Choice Holidays in September 2007. The Thomson Airways brand was launched for the combined airline on 1 November 2008.

The new brand retained the Thomsonfly colour scheme, and aircraft in the fleet were gradually repainted. Several First Choice Airways aircraft remained in the First Choice livery as they were due to be phased out of service. A new livery, named "Dynamic Wave" (which will also be applied on Thomson Cruises ships), was introduced in May 2012.

TUI Airways became the first UK airline to take delivery of the Boeing 787 Dreamliner, receiving the first aircraft in May 2013. Passenger services with the aircraft began on 21 June 2013 with a flight between London Gatwick and Menorca. Also in 2013, the parent group TUI Travel, now known as TUI Group, ordered 70 Boeing 737 MAX for delivery to group airlines.

Rebrand
On 13 May 2015, it was announced by the TUI Group that all five of TUI's airline subsidiaries would be named TUI, whilst keeping their separate Air Operators Certificate, a process taking over three years to complete. TUI Airways was the last airline to be completed in late 2017. The rebrand began in mid-2016, with the addition of the new 'TUI' titles to its fleet.

In December 2016, Thomson Holidays launched their final television advertisement using the 'Thomson' brand, before integrating into the 'TUI' brand. During the rebrand in 2017, the "TOMSON" callsign was dropped and replaced with "TUI AIR" and then changed again to "TOMJET".

In May 2017, the brand TUI Airways began to be used in several areas and was implemented on all flight tracker applications. Most of the aircraft had been branded with 'TUI' titles, and onboard items such as glasses and napkins carried the new brand. Thomson Airways officially changed its legal name to TUI Airways on 2 October 2017. TUI's sister company, TUI UK (formerly Thomson Holidays), has ceased using the 'Thomson' brand, adopting the TUI UK brand on 18 October 2017.

Corporate affairs

Overview
The airline is part of a single-branded group, being the product of two mergers: the travel division of TUI Group with First Choice Holidays in September 2007 to form TUI Travel, under which their respective airlines, Thomsonfly and First Choice Airways, were merged under the former's Air Operator's Certificate in May 2008 and rebranded as Thomson Airways on 1 November 2008. The investable enterprise and overall leadership formally merged with TUI to form London (LSE) and Frankfurt (DAX) listed TUI Group since December 2014. TUI Airways officially changed its legal name from Thomson Airways to TUI Airways on 2 October 2017. This was in line with sister companies TUI fly Belgium, TUI fly Deutschland, TUI fly Netherlands and TUI fly Nordic.

Head office
The airline's head office is in the Wigmore House near Luton, Bedfordshire. The facility is adjacent to Luton Airport.

Business figures

Destinations

Most scheduled flights operated by TUI Airways are on behalf of tour operators. The airline offers flights to destinations around the Mediterranean, the Caribbean and the Indian Ocean from 19 base airports in the United Kingdom. Additionally, seasonal charter routes are served from Copenhagen, Dublin, Helsinki, Oslo and Stockholm.

Fleet

Current fleet
As of December 2022, the TUI Airways Ltd fleet consists of the following aircraft:

Historical fleet

TUI Airways formerly operated the following aircraft:

See also
List of airlines of the United Kingdom

References

External links

Airlines established in 2008
British Air Transport Association
Companies based in Luton
Companies based in Crawley
Charter airlines of the United Kingdom
TUI Group
British companies established in 2008
2008 establishments in England
British subsidiaries of foreign companies